Hugh M. Bland (November 1, 1898 – April 1, 1967) was a justice of the Arkansas Supreme Court in 1966.

Bland, then a Chancellor from Fort Smith, Arkansas, was appointed by Governor Orval Faubus to a seat vacated by the resignation of J. Frank Holt.

References

Justices of the Arkansas Supreme Court
1898 births
1967 deaths